Elsword: El Lady is an aeni (South Korean animation) based on the South Korean online game Elsword.

Episodes

Music

Opening theme

Ending theme

See also 
 Aeni

References

External links
  
  

South Korean animated television series
South Korean web series
2017 works
2017 in South Korea
2017 in animation
Korean-language works
Works based on video games
Animated web series